Avianca Cargo (formerly Tampa Cargo - Transportes Aereos Mercantiles PanAmericanos S.A.) is a cargo airline based at José María Córdova International Airport in Medellín, Colombia. It is an all-cargo airline transporting flowers from Latin America to Miami, as well as general cargo throughout the Americas.

History

The airline was established in March 11, 1973 by Luís H. Coulson along with Captain Juan Fernando Mesa, Captain Orlando Botero Escobar and Captain Anibal Obando Echeverri. It commenced operations with a Douglas DC-6A, which formed part of the initial fleet that was acquired. These were retired in the early 1980s.

After overcoming several crises due to drug trafficking problems in one of its aircraft, in 1988, Tampa Cargo decided to renew its fleet by bringing Douglas DC-8s with the most modern technology of its time, including GPS positioning systems and CFM engines.

Martinair signed an agreement to acquire a 40% stake in Tampa Cargo in 1996, which was later increased to 58% in 2003.

On July 26, 2003, the company inaugurated its Maintenance Hangar in Rionegro-Antioquia and the new route to Perú was placed in operation that same year. In September 2004, Tampa Cargo started its fleet renovation by incorporating the Boeing 767-200ER.

Avianca acquired a 100% stake in Tampa Cargo in July 2008.

On February 1, 2010, Tampa Cargo was advised that after concluding the regulatory approval and the approval of competences required to concrete the union announced in October 2009, Synergy Group, the owner of Avianca, and Kingsland Holding Limited, the owner of Grupo TACA, signed the Agreement through which the closing that started up the strategic union of their businesses was made official, and that the name of the strategic union was AviancaTaca Holding. Then, the holding created the Cargo Vice-Presidency to which Tampa Cargo and its cargo aircraft fleet belong, naming Tampa Cargo the administrator of the Avianca and Taca commercial aircraft capacity.

On September 27, 2011, Avianca ordered four Airbus A330-200Fs to replace the existing Tampa Cargo fleet, with deliveries to commence in December 2012. This made Tampa Cargo the first A330F operator in Latin America.

The airline was re-branded as Avianca Cargo in May 28, 2013.

Destinations

Avianca Cargo operates to the following destinations:

Fleet

Current fleet

The Avianca Cargo fleet consists of the following aircraft as of May 2022.

Former fleet
The airline previously operated the following aircraft:

Accidents and incidents

On December 14, 1983, a Boeing 707-320C (registered HK-2401X) crashed into a factory after taking off from Medellín's Olaya Herrera Airport. The cause of the accident was a failure on engines 3 and 4 by foreign objects during the initial ascent. All 3 crew members on board died, plus 22 on the ground.

On July 14, 1989, a Douglas DC-8-63F (registered HK-3490X) took off from Miami International Airport, when the main cargo door opened shortly after. The aircraft returned to the airport and landed safely.

On October 9, 1994, a Boeing 707-320C (registered HK-3355X) was flying from São Paulo to Santa Cruz de la Sierra. When climbing, the second hydraulic pump light of the engine 3 illuminated. The leak couldn't be stopped and the aircraft returned to São Paulo. The nosegear didn't extend and the main gear didn't lock down and the aircraft slid during the emergency landing. None of the 5 occupants on board were killed.

On February 4, 2007, a Douglas DC-8-71F (registered HK-4277), operating a cargo flight to Miami, veered to the right during landing approach. The pilot said that it may have been due to a crosswind. The aircraft's landing gear collapsed when touchdown the runway. None of the 3 occupants on board were killed, while the aircraft was damaged beyond repairs.

See also
List of airlines of Colombia

References

External links
Official website

Avianca
Airlines of Colombia
Airlines established in 1973
Cargo airlines
Colombian companies established in 1973